Klubi Futbollistik Liria Prizren, commonly known as Liria, is a professional football club based in Prizren, Kosovo. The club plays in the First Football League of Kosovo, which is the second tier of football in the country. The club is one of the oldest and one of the most successful clubs in Kosovo.

<noinclude>

History

Early years
The first football arrived in Prizren in 1922 from Skopje by an unknown photograph. Although little is known about the clubs history, it was found in 1930. They played in the Yugoslav lower leagues until the beginning of World War II, and during this times as an organized club it changed its name to Sharr, probably after the Sharr Mountains. In this time it competed in different places in the region. When the region was annexed by Albania. Liria, then was renamed as Prizreni, participated for one season in the 1942 Albanian Superliga. By winning the North Zone, they qualified to the final stage of the tournament, where they lost in the semifinals against Tirana.

After the end of the World War II, the club returned to the Yugoslav football league system. During these time, the regime in power calls the club by its new name, Metohija. The club had this name until 1970 when it was given the name it has today, Liria. The name comes from the Albanian word for "Freedom". From 1945 to 1991, Liria competed in the Kosovo Province League which was a part of the Yugoslav football system. The winners of this league would get promotion to the Yugoslav Second League. During this period, Liria won four province league titles, earning them promotion to play on Yugoslav Second League on series of occasions. With this achievements, Liria was one of the most successful clubs in the Kosovo Province League.

Kosovo independent league (1991–1998)
In 1991, the Football Federation of Kosovo organized the independent system of football competitions in Kosovo. Liria, played a very historical role in these developments, playing the first historical match, with Ballkani in the village of Studenqan in Suhareka. The match was played on 20 August 1991 and ended with a draw. The first historical goal of the newly league was also scored by Lirias, Flamur Bytyqi. In the 1994–95 season, Liria managed to win their first Kosovo league title.

Post war (1999–2010)
After the Kosovo War, Liria continued competing in the top tier of Kosovan football. In the 2002/03 season, Liria finished second last in the league which resulted relegation to the second division. And after one season, they came first in their group(B) and won promotion to the recently formed elite league, Kosovo Superleague. In the season 2004/05 they finished in 6th place enough for the qualifying rounds of championship playoff. They ended up in 5th place in the playoff with Besa Peje being champions. After some disappointing results in the 2006/2007 season the club was relegated back to the second division. However the club managed to win the 2006–07 Kosovar Cup, beating Flamurtari 3–0 on penalties in the final held at Fadil Vokrri Stadium. The club stayed in the second tier for two seasons, until they got their promotion back in the 2008–09 season. The next year, the club won the 2009–10 Kosovar Cup, beating Vëllaznimi 3–1 in extra time.

Up and downs (2011–2020)
The seasons after winning the Kosovar cup in the 2009/10 season, things went well for Liria until the 2012/13 season. After one of the worst ever seasons in the clubs history, they were relegated after finishing last in the league. Back in the second division, they played there only for two seasons, before finishing 2nd in the 2014/15 season after Llapi and getting promoted back to the elite. First season after promotion, Liria came in the 7th place avoiding relegation playoff with four points. The next season did not go any well either, with the 2016/17 season ending in 8th place and avoiding relegation playoff again by two points. 2017/18 season ended, with Liria in 7th place and once again avoiding relegation playoff by four points. After all of these disappointing season results the 2018/19 season saw Liria being relegated to the second division, after finishing second last with poor results. In the 2019/20 season in second division, Liria finished 3rd and almost got promoted back with only 5 points between them and the second place, Arbëria.

Present (2021–)
Second season in the second division after their relegation in 2018/19, the club ended the 20/21 season in 5th place in their group(A).

Ground
Liria play their home matches at the Përparim Thaçi Stadium built in 1937. It was named after a former player of Liria, who also fought in the Kosovo War.

Support
Arpagjik't are the clubs main supporters.

Rivalries
Liria's rivals in Kosovo are mostly from the large cities in Kosovo. One longtime rival is Vëllaznimi, as the teams played often in the Yugoslavian periods. Another historical rival is Prishtina, and their rivalry is between two of the largest cities in Kosovo. Their local rival is A&N, even though there is no big and historical clashes between them since their club were only formed in 2017.

Honours

Domestic
Superliga e Kosovës/Kosovo Superleague
Winners (1): 1994–95

Liga e Parë/Second DivisionWinners (2): 2003–04 (joint-winner), 2008–09Kupa e Kosovës/Kosovar CupWinners (2): 2006–07, 2009–10

Yugoslav football league systemKosovo Province LeagueWinners (4):''' 1974–75, 1980–81, 1983–84, 1986–87

Players

Current squad

Coaching staff

Managerial history

Seasons
Seasons from 1991, as of 2022. The club has spent most of its time in the top-tier only being relegated 4 times, (2002/03, 2006/07, 2012/13, 2018/19).
 Kosovo Independent League/Kosovo Superleague: 23 seasons
 Second Division: 9 seasons

References

External links
 

 
Association football clubs established in 1930
Football clubs in Yugoslavia
Football clubs in Kosovo